Miran Vodovnik (born 11 September 1977) is a Slovenian shot putter. His personal best throw and Slovene record is 20.76 metres, achieved in June 2006 in Thessaloniki.

He finished eleventh at the 2004 Olympic Games, seventh at the 2007 European Indoor Championships and sixth at the 2007 World Championships. He also competed at the 2003 World Championships and 2005 World Championships and the 2008 Olympic Games without reaching the final.

Competition record

References

1977 births
Living people
Slovenian shot putters
Athletes (track and field) at the 2004 Summer Olympics
Athletes (track and field) at the 2008 Summer Olympics
Olympic athletes of Slovenia
Male shot putters
Slovenian male athletes
Athletes (track and field) at the 2005 Mediterranean Games
Mediterranean Games competitors for Slovenia